Ian Thomson (13 April 1930 – 22 November 2014) was a Scotland international rugby union footballer, who played as a Full Back.

Rugby career

Amateur career

Thomson played for Heriot's. He also played rugby for the Army.

Provincial career

Thomson played for Edinburgh District against Glasgow District in the 1950-51 season's Inter-City match and the 1951-52 season's Inter-City match. Edinburgh District lost both matches.

International career

He was capped for  7 times between 1951 and 1953, all 7 caps in Five Nations matches. He made his international debut against Wales playing in front of a then record crowd of 80 000  at Murrayfield Stadium.

He battled for the Scotland fullback shirt with Glasgow University's Neil Cameron.

Outside of rugby

Thomson worked in Insurance and worked for Standard Life. He retired in 1990.

Cricket

Thomson was a very good cricketeer. On occasion, he was the twelfth man for Scotland, but he never played for the national side.

References

1930 births
2014 deaths
Scottish rugby union players
Scotland international rugby union players
Rugby union fullbacks
Edinburgh District (rugby union) players
Heriot's RC players
Rugby union players from Edinburgh